The Nebraska Amish, also called Old Schoolers, are a relatively small affiliation of the Amish. They are the most conservative subgroup of Amish, indicated not only by their use of technology but also by their particular style of dress. They emerged in 1881 as a conservative split from the Byler Amish, who themselves emerged as the first conservative splinter group from the Amish mainstream in 1849.

History 

Amish settled in the Mifflin County region of Pennsylvania – the Kishacoquillas Valley – as early as 1791, coming from Lancaster County, Pennsylvania. In the 1840s there were three Amish congregations in the region with a membership of 290. In 1849 Samuel B. King, a conservative bishop who warned against adopting the use of rubber tires on buggies and who was also accused of giving sermons that were too long, was "silenced", that is he was removed from his ministerial duties. One of the three districts, the "lower" district sided with King and split from the other two districts forming the Byler Amish as the first conservative split from the Amish mainstream in North America.

Around 1880, Bishop Yost H. Yoder from the Kishacoquillas Valley settlement led nine families from Juniata County, Pennsylvania, to Gosper County in south-central Nebraska, founding an Old Order Amish settlement there in the hope of maintaining their traditional distinct church and family life. 

Yoder went back to the Kishacoquillas Valley in Pennsylvania in 1881 to assist in the establishment of a conservative splinter group originating from the Byler Amish. Yoder eventually became the leader of the new group. Because Yoder had been living in Nebraska for some time, the group was nicknamed the Nebraska Amish by others. 

In 1933, a group called the Zook faction broke away from the Nebraska Amish over the use of projecting roof gables, and formed a separate district, holding their own worship services and having their own bishops. The Zook group split again in 1978. Though differences exist, they are almost unnoticeable to outsiders. Since the late 1970s they have split several times. Groups include the Rufus Zook group, the Chris Yoder group, and others. 

In the early 1980s several church districts of the Swartzentruber Amish in Minnesota, Tennessee, and Ohio split from the Swartzentruber church districts elsewhere because of disagreements over shunning ("Bann und Meidung"). This group, known as the "Jeck Jeckey Leit" is now affiliated with the Nebraska Amish.

Practice and belief 

Nebraska Amish dress the most conservatively of all Amish groups. Their dress is quite different from other Old Order groups because it is less influenced by the plain dress that the Quakers had developed earlier. Men are known for not wearing suspenders, trousers are laced up in the back instead. Men also wear white shirts, brown denim trousers and jackets and hair at shoulder length. The hats of the men are very broad brimmed. Women do not wear bonnets, wearing black kerchiefs and flat straw hats instead.

Concerning the use of technologies, the Nebraska Amish are about as restrictive as the Swartzentruber Amish, see table below. Like other Old Order Amish, the Nebraska Amish do not use motorized equipment or indoor plumbing. Other differences include the fact that they do not place screens on their doors or windows, men only wear white shirts, curtains are not used in homes, buggy tops must be white, men's hair must be shoulder length, no lawn mowers are allowed and houses must not have projecting roofs.

Because Nebraska Amish have a relatively small number of youth, they allow dating over the line. So young people of different Nebraska Amish groups can date each other; however, when they want to marry they have to decide which of the groups they will join. The Nebraska Amish practice bundling.

Members and congregations 
In 1900 the Old School—i.e., the Nebraska Amish—had 2 districts with 159 members, in 1956 the original Yoder group had 70 and the Zook group 60 members. As of 2000, the Nebraska Amish had 14 church districts and 775 members and a total population of 1,744, mostly in northeastern Mifflin County. As of 2011 they had 19 church districts in 5 settlements. The main Nebraska Amish settlement is found in Mifflin County, Pennsylvania, with small extensions into Centre, Huntingdon, and Union counties. There are 3 other Nebraska Amish settlements in Pennsylvania and one settlement near Andover, Ohio, just at the border to Pennsylvania, which was founded in 1992.

Notes

References
Amish Society, by John A. Hostetler
The Amish in America: Settlements that Failed, by David Luthy 
Mennonite Encyclopedia

Anabaptism in Pennsylvania
Old Order Amish
Protestantism in Nebraska